This is a list of districts in the Indian state of Jharkhand ranked by literacy rate as per provisional data of 2011 census.

With a literacy rate of 67.63%, below the national average of 74.04%, as per the 2011 Census, Jharkhand ranks 32nd amongst the 36 states and union territories in India in terms of literacy rate.

See also
 Indian states ranking by literacy rate

References

Districts by literacy rate
Literacy in India